The longhead dab (Limanda proboscidea) is a flatfish of the family Pleuronectidae. Its native habitat is the temperate waters of the northern Pacific, and it range stretches from the Sea of Okhotsk and the Kuril Islands to the Bering Sea and the arctic west coast of Canada.

Diet

The diet of the longhead dab consists mainly of zoobenthos organisms, including polychaetes, bivalves, amphipods and other benthos crustaceans.

References

longhead dab
Fish of the North Pacific
longhead dab